Osaro Obobaifo (1 August 1966 – 1991) was a Nigerian footballer. He competed in the men's tournament at the 1988 Summer Olympics. He died in a car crash in Belgium.

References

External links
 

1961 births
1991 deaths
Nigerian footballers
Nigeria international footballers
Olympic footballers of Nigeria
Footballers at the 1988 Summer Olympics
Place of birth missing
Association football midfielders
Road incident deaths in Belgium
Bendel United F.C. players